Men Bingyue (1890–1944) was a general in the Chinese National Revolutionary Army during the Second Sino-Japanese War.  As commander of the 7th Cavalry Division he participated in the Suiyuan Campaign in 1936, defeating the Japanese backed Inner Mongolian Army.  After the beginning of the Second Sino-Japanese War in 1937 he was made Commander of the 6th Cavalry Army, fighting in the Battle of Taiyuan defending Suiyuan. In 1940 he was made Deputy Commander in Chief of the 17th Army Group.  In 1941, he was made Commander of the 7th Cavalry Army.  He died in August 1944 in Chongqing.

Sources 
 中国抗日战争正面战场作战记 (China's Anti-Japanese War Combat Operations)
 Guo Rugui, editor-in-chief Huang Yuzhang
 Jiangsu People's Publishing House
 Date published : 2005-7-1
 
 Online in Chinese: https://web.archive.org/web/20090116005113/http://www.wehoo.net/book/wlwh/a30012/A0170.htm
 第二部分：从“九一八”事变到西安事变 日本侵绥的战备企图和中日
 Part II : From the "September 18 Incident" to the Xi'an Incident  Japanese invasion of Suiyuan to prepare their planned union of China and Japan
 Hsu Long-hsuen and Chang Ming-kai, History of The Sino-Japanese War (1937–1945) 2nd Ed.,1971. Translated by Wen Ha-hsiung, Chung Wu Publishing; 33, 140th Lane, Tung-hwa Street, Taipei, Taiwan Republic of China.

External links 
 The Generals of World War II, Generals from China: Men Bingyue

1890 births
1944 deaths
Chinese people of World War II
National Revolutionary Army generals